Satoko Akiyama (秋山 紗登子 Akiyama Satoko) is a female Japanese popular music artist.  She made her debut with Boku ga Shiteagerareru koto.  After breaking up with the record company, she is currently working with her friend KAZUKI creating a group called FEBRUA.

Discography

Singles
 'Boku ga Shiteagerareru koto' (2/21/1998)

External links
 Satoko Akiyama Official Website

Japanese pop musicians
Living people
Year of birth missing (living people)
Place of birth missing (living people)